Hodge Hall is a historic academic building located on the campus of South Carolina State University at Orangeburg, Orangeburg County, South Carolina. It was built in 1928 in the Palladian style.  It is a two-story, nine nay, brick building with a full basement, a flat roof and a parapet. The front facade features a flat-roofed portico with paired fluted columns and pilasters. The building has two large, modern brick rear additions.

It was added to the National Register of Historic Places in 1985. It is located included in the South Carolina State College Historic District.

References 

African-American history of South Carolina
University and college buildings on the National Register of Historic Places in South Carolina
Palladian Revival architecture in the United States
School buildings completed in 1928
Buildings and structures in Orangeburg County, South Carolina
National Register of Historic Places in Orangeburg County, South Carolina
Historic district contributing properties in South Carolina
South Carolina State University
1928 establishments in South Carolina